Vincent Sowah Boi-Nai (born 1945) is a Ghanaian Catholic priest who has been the Bishop of Yendi since 1999.

References

Living people
20th-century Roman Catholic bishops in Ghana
21st-century Roman Catholic bishops in Ghana
People educated at St. Thomas Aquinas Senior High School
1945 births
Roman Catholic bishops of Yendi